A corn exchange is a building where merchants trade grains. The word "corn" in British English denotes all cereal grains, such as wheat and barley; in the United States these buildings were called grain exchange. Such trade was common in towns and cities across England until the 19th century, but as the trade became centralised in the 20th century many such buildings were used for other purposes. Several have since become historical landmarks.

In the United States, the Minneapolis Grain Exchange is still used to manage the commodities and futures exchange of grain products.

History in England

Corn exchanges were initially held as open markets normally controlled by the town or city authorities. Dedicated corn exchanges start appearing in the earlier part of the 18th century, increasing greatly following the repeal of the Corn Laws in 1846. They declined after the Great Depression of British Agriculture in the late 19th century, and many exchange buildings were converted for other civic uses.

List of corn exchanges

Australia
 Corn Exchange, Sydney

Canada
 Winnipeg Grain Exchange

Ireland
 The Corn Exchange, Dublin, a Commedia dell'arte theatre company founded in 1995 in Dublin.

The Corn Exchange, Athy, Kildare, now a court house.

United Kingdom
See also: Corn Exchanges in England

 The Exchange, Bristol
 Bishop's Stortford Corn Exchange
 Bury St Edmund's Corn Exchange
 Corn Exchange, Bedford
 Corn Exchange, Blandford Forum. See The Corn Exchange
 Corn Exchange, Brighton. See Brighton Dome
 Corn Exchange, Camborne
 Cambridge Corn Exchange
 Corn Exchange, Chichester
 Cupar Corn Exchange
 Dalkeith Corn Exchange
 Corn Exchange, Devizes
 Corn Exchange, Exeter
 Doncaster Corn Exchange
 Edinburgh Corn Exchange
 Corn Exchange, Faringdon
 Corn Exchange, Haverhill
 Corn Exchange, Hitchin
 Corn Exchange, Ipswich
 Palace Theatre (Kilmarnock), originally opened as a Corn Exchange in 1863
 Corn Exchange, King's Lynn
 Corn Exchange, Kirkcaldy
 Leeds Corn Exchange
 Leicester Corn Exchange
 Corn Exchange, Lewes
 Corn Exchange, Lichfield 
 Lincoln Corn Exchange
 Liverpool Corn Exchange
 London Corn Exchange on Mark Lane, the UK's primary agricultural exchange, which later became part of Liffe.
 Corn Exchange, Maidstone (see the Hazlitt Theatre)
 Corn Exchange, Manchester
 Market Rasen Corn Exchange
 Newark-on-Trent Corn Exchange
 Corn Exchange, Newbury
 Corn Exchange, Newport
 Corn Exchange, Preston
 Corn Exchange, Rochester
 Corn Exchange, Sheffield
 Corn Exchange, Sleaford
 St Ives Corn Exchange
 Corn Exchange, Tonbridge
 Corn Exchange, Tunbridge Wells
 Corn Exchange, Wallingford
 Corn Exchange, Winchester
 Corn Exchange, Witney

United States
 Minneapolis Grain Exchange
 Philadelphia Corn Exchange
 Sioux City Grain Exchange

See also
 Grain trade
 Commodity market

References

Agricultural buildings
Commodity exchanges
Agricultural economics
Maize